The 2021 Ball State Cardinals football team represented Ball State University during the 2021 NCAA Division I FBS football season. The Cardinals were led by sixth-year head coach Mike Neu and played their home games at Scheumann Stadium in Muncie, Indiana. They competed as members of the West Division of the Mid-American Conference.

Previous season

The Cardinals finished the 2020 season 7–1, 5–1 in MAC play to finish in first place in the West Division. They went on to defeat Buffalo in the MAC Championship Game. The Cardinals were invited to the Arizona Bowl, where they defeated San Jose State for their first bowl game win in program history.

Schedule

Rankings

Game summaries

Western Illinois

at No. 11 Penn State

at Wyoming

Toledo

Army

at Western Michigan

at Eastern Michigan

Miami (Ohio)

at Akron

at Northern Illinois (Bronze Stalk Trophy)

Central Michigan

Buffalo

vs. Georgia State (Camellia Bowl)

References

Ball State
Ball State Cardinals football seasons
Ball State Cardinals football